Rosamunde is a singspiel by Anton Schweitzer to a German-language libretto by Christoph Martin Wieland for the Seyler theatrical company of Abel Seyler, premiered 20 January 1780, at the Nationaltheater Mannheim. The singspiel was revived by the 60th Schwetzingen Festival in 2012 in a production by Jens Daniel Herzog.

References

Operas
1780 operas
Operas by Anton Schweitzer
Works by Christoph Martin Wieland
German-language operas